LISFF Wiz-Art is an annual International Short Film Festival, which takes place in Lviv, Ukraine at the end of July. The festival was started by art formation Wiz-Art, which was founded in 2008. The festival shows more than 100 brand new short movies every year. Wiz-Art is a powerful cultural and educational platform that unites Ukrainian and foreign filmmakers and introduces them to the Ukrainian audience experienced professionals. The festival has also premiered films featured as part of the Brussels Short Film Festival, in addition to collaborating with other festival programs.

Competition program
Short films from all over the world participate in the festival. Participants from any country can send an application form. The festival shows more than 100 brand new short movies every year. Selected films in each category are eligible for several awards. Also, viewers are able to watch films from the non-competition program. Each year, the festival team choose a socially relevant theme which they use as the basis for visual design at the event.

Awards 
 GRAND PRIX OF LISFF Wiz-Art (in both competitions)
international competition:
 BEST DIRECTOR
 AUDIENCE AWARD
national competition:
 BEST UKRAINIAN FILM
 AUDIENCE AWARD

Jury
The festival jury is elected by the administration of the festival. Usually there are several foreign guests in the jury and necessarily representative of Ukrainian cinema. The participants of the jury are professional directors, movie creators and producers. For eight years of the festival existence representatives of the jury were: Ruth Paxton (Scotland), David Lindner (Germany), Vincent Moon (France), Igor Podolchak (Ukraine), Achiktan Ozan (Turkey), Anna Klara Ellen Aahrén (Sweden), Katarzyna Gondek (Poland), Christoph Schwarz (Austria), Gunhild Enger (Norway), Szymon Stemplewski (Poland), Philip Ilson (UK) and others.

Festival history

2008
20-22 of November 2008 — I International Festival of Visual Art Wiz-Art. There were screenings of Sean Conway (UK), Boris Kazakov (Russia), Milos Tomich (Serbia), Volker Schreiner (Germany) films and retrospective show of the works of the famous avant-gardist Maya Deren (USA). 50 films were shown, 10 of which were short films of young Ukrainian filmmakers.

2009
23-25 of May 2009 — II International Festival of Visual Art Art Wiz-Art. Special guests were British movie maker and poet Julian Gende, German director Martin Sulzer (Landjugend) and Kevin Kirhenbaver, Russian producer and teacher Vladimir Smorodin. There were performances of VJs Shifted Vision and band Надто Сонна (2sleepy). There were retrospective shows of Scott Pagano and David Orayli works and the best movies of the Film School in Zlín (Czech Republic), Stockholm (Sweden), and Hamburg (Germany). Golden Apricot Yerevan International Film Festival and Slovak Festival Early Melons (Bratislava) presented their programs. Overall, 100 short films were shown.

2010
20–23 May 2010 — III International Short Film Festival Wiz-Art 2010. Special guests and members of the jury were Turkish director Ozan Achiktan, Slovak media artist Anton Cerny, Swedish filmmaker Anna Klara Oren, the Ukrainian producer Alexander Debych. The Festival was attended by directors from Ireland (Tony Donoh'yu), Spain (Fernando Uson), Portugal (Ana Mendes), Poland (Tomasz Jurkiewicz), Ukraine (Anna Smoliy, Gregory somebody Dmitry Red, Mrs. Ermine). There were retrospective shows of short films Finland and Asia. The best films of festivals in Italy (A Corto di Donne) and Russia (Beginning) were presented. The Grand Prix got the film "The Day of Life" (directed by Joon Kwok, Hong Kong). 105 films from 30 countries took part in competition and non-competition programs.

2011
26–29 May 2011 — IV International Short Film Festival Wiz-Art 2011. Special guests and members of the jury were Scottish filmmaker Ruth Paxton, German producer David Lindner and Ukrainian director Igor Podolchak. Tommy Mustniyemi (video-artist, Finland), Mike Mudgee (filmmaker, Germany), Emil Stang Lund (director, Norway), Morten Halvorsen (director, Denmark), Armin Dirolf (director, Germany) and others visited the festival. There were retrospective short films shows of the French-speaking part of Canada, the French animation and special program of Ukrainian short films. 98 films were shown in competition and non-competition programs. The Grand Prix got animated film The Little Quentin (Albert 'T Hooft & Paco Vink Netherlands 2010).

2012
26–29 July 2012 — V International Short Film Festival Wiz-Art 2012. Special guests and members of the jury were French filmmaker and traveler Vincent Moon, Icelandic filmmaker Isolde Uhadottir, coordinator of the International Festival Molodist Ilko Gladstein (Ukraine), Irish filmmaker Paul Odonahyu, also known as Ocusonic, Canadian director and producer Félix Dufour-Laperrière. The festival was attended by Hungarian director and an organizer of the BUSHO Festival Tamas Habelli, Ukrainian director Alexander Yudin, Max Afanasyev and Larisa Artyuhina. There were retrospective shows of Hungarian and Italian short films, as well as shows of young Ukrainian films "Cry, but shoot" (the quote of Alexander Dovzhenko) involving directors. As the part of Wiz-Art 2012 the audience had an opportunity to visit the Wiz-Art Lab — film school with lectures and master classes given by participants and guests of the festival. 98 films from 38 countries were shown in competition and non-competition programs. Grand Prix received the film Fungus (Charlotte Miller, Sweden, 2011).

2013

24-29 of July 2013 — VI International Short Film Festival Wiz-Art 2013. Special guests were Philip Illson, director of London Short Film Festival, Maria Sigrist, Austrian filmmaker, Dmytro Sukholytkiy-Sobchuk, Ukrainian filmmaker, Florian Pochlatko, Austrian filmmaker, and Romas Zabarauskas, Lithuanian film director. Grand Prix received the film Maybes (Florian Pochlatko, Austria, 2012) — an intimate story with larger issues at stake relating to the time we are living in. The other winners of Wiz-Art 2013 are: Best Director — Tarquin Netherway for the film The River (Australia, 2012), Best Script — Prematur (Gunhild Enger, Norway, 2012), Special Mention — Jamon (Iria Lopez, United Kingdom, 2012), Audience Award — Touch and See (Taras Dron, Ukraine, 2013).

2014

24-27 of July 2014 — VII International Short Film Festival Wiz-Art 2013. Special guests and members of the jury are: Gunhild Enger, Norwegian film director, Kateryna Gornostai, Ukrainian film director, Szymon Stemplewski, director of the Short Waves Festival (Poland), Mykyta Lyskov, Ukrainian director-animator, Volodymyr Tykhyy, art director of the Babylon’13 project, Olha Makarchuk, Ukrainian director-animator, Lisa Weber, Austrian filmmaker, and Ismael Nava Alejos, Mexican film director. The competition program consists of 15 short films from around the world. The national competition program has 11 Ukrainian shorts. Also, Wiz-Art 2014 presents a special documentary program dedicated to short films about Euromaidan and retrospectives of best Ukrainian short film classic of XX century. Wiz-Art Film School, an educational block, consists of lectures, Q&A sessions, meetings and workshops with festival guests.

References

External links 
 Official website

Film festivals in Ukraine
Short film festivals
Annual events in Ukraine
Summer events in Ukraine